Yuliya Fomenko may refer to:
Yuliya Fomenko (runner) (born 1979), Russian middle distance runner
Yuliya Fomenko (swimmer) (born 1981), Russian Olympic swimmer